Xiaomi produces 
smartphones 
(Xiaomi Series, Mi Note Series, Mi Max Series, MIX Series, T Series and Redmi Series), tablets, laptops, wearable devices, TVs, routers and other smart home devices on their web store and on third-party websites. Some of their products are listed below.

Smartphones

MIUI 

Xiaomi's smartphones run MIUI. MIUI is a stock and aftermarket Android firmware for smartphones and tablet computers based on the open-source Android operating system. It is available on Xiaomi devices as well as devices made by other companies. It is Xiaomi's earliest known product.

Xiaomi Series 
Xiaomi's flagship mobile handset line is the Xiaomi series (formerly known as Mi series).

The Mi 3 uses a modified Qualcomm Snapdragon 800 and was found on test to be the world's fastest Android smartphone according to benchmark testing apps Antutu, Quadrant, and Geekbench.

Xiaomi showcased its ceramic Mi 5 on 24 February at MWC 2016. It is also equipped with NFC and a mobile payment function Mi Pay launched in April 2016.

On 27 September 2016, Xiaomi released the Mi 5s and Mi 5s Plus.

On 4 November 2016, Xiaomi released the Mi MIX. The Mi mix is characterized by a 91.3% screen to body ratio, which was achieved by removing all the top-mounted sensors: the proximity sensor has been replaced by ultrasound, the earpiece has been replaced with a piezoelectric speaker that uses the metal frame to generate sound, and the front-facing camera is relocated to the bottom.

The Xiaomi Mi 5c was launched in February 2017, featuring the debut of Xiaomi's in-house processor, Pinecone Surge S1.

Xiaomi Mi 9 was launched on 20 February 2019 in Beijing, China. This is Xiaomi's first triple camera smartphone. It is powered by Snapdragon 855 SoC with 8GB RAM.

Xiaomi Mi 10 was announced on 13 February 2020. This is Xiaomi's first phone to feature a Super-AMOLED display with a high refresh rate. This phone is powered by the Qualcomm Snapdragon 865 processor.

Xiaomi Mi 10 Ultra was announced on 11 August 2020. This is Xiaomi's first phone to support 120 watt wired charging.

Xiaomi 12T and 12T Pro was launched on 4 October 2022. Xiaomi 12T Pro is the first phone of Xiaomi that brings 200 MP camera.

Mi Note Series 
In January 2015 in Beijing, China, Xiaomi unveiled the Mi Note and Mi Note Pro. Both devices have a 5.7-inch display and use a dual-glass design with a 2.5D front and 3D rear glass.

The Mi Note is powered by hardware more than a year old at launch, the Mi Note Pro has the newer octa-core Qualcomm Snapdragon 810 processor, Adreno 430 GPU, 4 GB LPDDR4 RAM and LTE Cat 9, giving it a higher performance than the Mi Note, with approximately the same battery life.

Mi Max Series

MIX Series

Civi series

Redmi series 

Redmi is a China-based smartphone and a sub-brand. It was introduced as a budget smartphone line manufactured by Xiaomi, that was first announced in July 2013.

POCO series 

Although originally marketed under Xiaomi, Pocophone was later split off into a separate sub-brand. Xiaomi's Vice President and Xiaomi India's Managing Director Manu Kumar Jain tweeted, " What started as a sub-brand within Xiaomi, has grown into its own identity. Pocophone F1 was an incredibly popular phone. We feel the time is right to let POCO operate on its own."

Concept phones
The Xiaomi Mi MIX Alpha is an Android-based smartphone, Xiaomi described it as a concept phone, but planned on bringing it into small-scale production. It was scheduled to be released in December 2019, but has been cancelled due to manufacturing complexities.

Other MIUI-based devices

Pad Tablets 
The Xiaomi Pad (formerly known as Xiaomi Mi Pad) is the line of tablets from Xiaomi. The first Mi Pad was released in 2014.

Mi WiFi 
The Xiaomi MiWiFi is a series network routers initially launched on 23 April 2014. The latest in the series is a corporate-class router with built-in storage of up to 6 TB. It is said to have a PCB dual-antenna array supporting 802.11ac Wi-Fi standard, a Broadcom 4709C dual-core 1.4 GHz processor and 512 MB of flash memory. The router can be used as a wireless hard drive for movies and photos, in tandem with Xiaomi's apps that feature remote downloads, automatic backups, remote access to files and other features.

Xiaomi TV 
The Xiaomi TV (formerly known as Mi TV) is a line of smart TVs designed and marketed by Xiaomi. It runs Android and was initially announced in 2013. The latest in the series are Mi TV 3s 43 inch and the Mi TV 3s 65 inch curved. The Mi TV 3s 43 inch has a 43-inch 1920p x 1080p from either LG or AUO. It has the 1.45 GHz quad-core MStar 6A908 Cortex-A9 processor with Mali-450 MP4 GPU, and 1 GB DDR3 RAM and 8 GB internal memory (eMMC 4.5).  At 10.9 mm, it is pretty thin for a TV.  The Mi TV 65 inch curved has a 4K Samsung display. It has a 1.4 GHz quad-core MStar 6A928 Cortex-A17 processor with Mali-760 MP4 GPU. For the memory, it has 2 GB DDR3 RAM and 8 GB internal memory (eMMC 50).  It is 5.9 mm thick, but it has to have a sound bar for audio.

Mi Box and Xiaomi TV Stick 

The Mi Box and Xiaomi TV Stick (formerly known as Mi TV Stick) are a smart set-top box and streaming stick for televisions. From deals struck with content providers, the set-top box offers films and TV shows with no user account nor subscription required. The box can also access content via its USB port, such as through an external hard disk. Due to content licensing restrictions, it was only available in mainland China until October 2016, Xiaomi released a Mi Box running Android TV, making it accessible worldwide. In October 2018, Xiaomi released Mi Box S, new version of Mi Box with Android TV Oreo, later updated to Pie (9.0). In India, Xiaomi launched the Mi Box S as Mi Box 4K. In July 2020, Xiaomi released the Mi TV Stick, a 1080p Android TV streaming stick with Android 9 Pie preinstalled.  In December 2021, Xiaomi released the Xiaomi TV Stick 4K, a 4K UHD streaming dongle with Android TV 11, and it supports Dolby Atmos and Dolby Vision.

Xiaomi Cloud 
Xiaomi Cloud (formerly known as Mi Cloud) is a cloud storage and cloud computing service created by Xiaomi. The service allows users to store data such as contacts, messages, photos and notes on remote computer servers for download to multiple devices running MIUI operating system. The service also includes a feature that allows users to track the location of their MIUI device as well as alarm, lock or reset it. Xiaomi Cloud service  is available public to connect directly through web or using your Xiaomi device.

Mi Talk 
Mi Talk was an internet-based cross-platform instant messenger mobile app available for Android and iOS, that launched in 2011. On January 19, 2021, Xiaomi announced Mi Talk would be discontinued in a message sent to all users, with the messaging functionality of the app being disabled on February 1 the same year. The whole service was discontinued on February 19.

Laptops

Mi Notebook Air 
In August 2016, Xiaomi launched two ultrabooks, 12.5" and 13.3".

The 2016 12.5" laptop had an Intel core M3 (th generation) processor, 4 GB DDR4 RAM and a 128 GB SSD. The price is RMB 3,499 and officially is only sold in mainland China.

The 2016 13.3" laptop had an Intel i5/i7 processor, 8 GB DDR4 RAM and a 256 GB SSD. It weighs 1.07 kg and is 12.9mm thin. The price is RMB 4,999 and officially is only sold in mainland China.

In March 2017, the new 12.5" laptop had an Intel core M3 (7th generation) processor and a 256 GB SDD.

In February 2018, Xiaomi released its Mi Notebook Air in Spain

Mi Notebook Air 4G 
Xiaomi released the Mi Notebook Air 4G with built-in 4G LTE by a SIM card.

The 12.5" laptop is powered by an Intel Core m3 processor with 4 GB of RAM and a 128 GB SSD.

The 13.3" laptop is powered by an Intel Core i7 processor with 8 GB of RAM and a 256 GB SSD.

Both laptops support USB Type-C.

Mi Gaming Laptop 
Specifications - 15.6" wide-color gamut ultra-thin bezels - NVIDIA Geforce GTX 1060 - 7th gen Intel Core i7 processor - 256GB SSD + 1TB HDD - Professional gaming keyboard.

Mi Notebook Pro 
Specifications-15.6" wide color gamut - NVIDIA MX150 - 8th Gen Intel Core i5/i7 processor - 256GB SSD - Long Battery Life

Xiaomi Book S 
In June 2022, Xiaomi released the Xiaomi Book S, its first Qualcomm Snapdragon-based 2-in-1 convertible tablet, and it runs on the ARM version of Windows 11.

Mi Electric Scooter 
The M365 Electric Scooter is an aluminium frame scooter (Approx. 1080mm * 430mm * 1140mm) that weighs about 12.5 kg. The M365 has a maximum speed of 25 km/h (max 18 km/h on Cruise control) with a 250 watt rated motor (16 Nm max torque). The battery pack is made up of thirty 18650 lithium-ion batteries from LG, allowing for a 30 km range. (30 km long-distance range on a single full charge measured under the following conditions: 75 kg load, 25 °C weather temperatures, flat road without strong winds, power saving mode, and 15 km/h constant speeds.)

Smartwatches and Smartbands

Xiaomi Smart Band 
The Mi Band was announced in August 2014. It has a 30-day battery life, can act as an alarm clock and tracks the wearer's fitness and sleep. The band also has the ability to unlock your phone based on proximity. With 2.8 million Mi Band shipments in the first quarter of 2015, Xiaomi became the world's second-largest wearables maker, accounting for 24.6% of the global market share.

Xiaomi announced the Mi Band 2 in June 2016. Mi Band 2 features PPG sensor for accurate heart rate tracking. It also uses an upgraded pedometer algorithm for gathering better fitness and sleep data. The Mi Band 2's housing was rated for IP67 water resistance.

The Mi Band 3 was released 18 July 2018. It has a larger battery, larger screen and improved water resistance.

Mechanical Watch 
Xiaomi released a mechanical watch called the CIGA Automatic Mechanical Watch. It has a square shape with rounded corners. The body is stainless steel and comes with a choice of black or silver. The watch comes with a metal mesh band or a leather strap. The mechanical movement is made by Seagull watch company. The watch was designed by Hong-Kong-based Michael Young and has won the German IF Design award.

Smart Home Products 

Note that products released by Xiaomi Smart Home are products of companies partnered with Xiaomi instead of Xiaomi themselves.
Includes robotic vacuum cleaners and other goods.

Xiaomi Home app  manages Xiaomi smart home products.

Mi Drone 
The Mi Drone has a 1080p camera and a 4K camera. It has a range of 2 km while able to maintain a 720p video stream.

See also
 History of Xiaomi

References 

Xiaomi
Xiaomi
Xiaomi
Xiaomi